The 2016 Women's Hockey Champions Trophy was the 22nd edition of the Hockey Champions Trophy for women. It was held between 18 and 26 June 2016 in London, United Kingdom.

Argentina won the tournament for a record seventh time after defeating the Netherlands 2–1 in the final.

Format
After three editions with two different formats, it was decided to go back to the same one used until the 2010 edition which consisted of a six-team, round robin tournament.

Qualification
A change in the qualification process was decided, similar to the one used until 2010. Alongside the host nation, the last Olympic, World Cup and World League champions qualify automatically as well as the winner of the 2014 Champions Challenge I. The remaining spot will be nominated by the FIH Executive Board, making a total of 6 competing teams. If teams qualify under more than once criteria, the additional teams will be invited by the FIH 
Executive Board as well.

 (Host nation)
 (Champions of the 2012 Summer Olympics and the 2014 World Cup)
 (Champions of the 2014–15 World League)
 (Winner of 2014 Champions Challenge I)
 (Invited by the FIH Executive Board)
 (Invited by the FIH Executive Board)

Umpires
Below are the nine umpires appointed by the International Hockey Federation:

Claire Adenot (FRA)
Frances Block (GBR)
Elena Eskina (RUS)
Kelly Hudson (NZL)
Michelle Joubert (RSA)
Stephanie Judefind (USA)
Kylie Seymour (AUS)
Emi Yamada (JPN)
Carolina de la Fuente (ARG)

Results
All times are local (UTC+1).

Pool

Classification

Fifth and sixth place

Third and fourth place

Final

Awards

Statistics

Final standings

Goalscorers

References

External links
Official website

2016
2016 in women's field hockey
International women's field hockey competitions hosted by England
2016 in English women's sport
International sports competitions in London
2016 sports events in London
Field hockey in London
June 2016 sports events in the United Kingdom
2016 in New Zealand women's sport
2016 in Australian women's field hockey
2016 in Dutch women's sport
2016 in Argentine sport
2016 in American women's sports